Dominica competed at the 2000 Summer Olympics in Sydney, Australia. This was the nation's second consecutive appearance at the Summer Olympics.

Athletics 

Men

Women

Swimming 

Men

Women

References
Official Olympic Reports

Nations at the 2000 Summer Olympics
2000
2000 in Dominica sport